K-type may refer to:

AEC K-type, a bus chassis
K-type star, a stellar spectral classification
K-type filter, a type of electronic filter
K-type asteroid, an unusual kind of asteroid